Ladislav Hudec (born 4 January 1957) is a former Slovak football player and recently manager of FK Inter Bratislava . He was former manager of Myjava.

Honours

Manager
Spartak Myjava
DOXXbet liga: Winners: 2011–12 (Promoted)
3.liga: Winners: 2020-21

External links
 Spartak Myjava profile

References

1957 births
Living people
Slovak footballers
Slovak football managers
FK Inter Bratislava players
FC Petržalka players
FC DAC 1904 Dunajská Streda managers
AS Trenčín managers
ŠK Slovan Bratislava managers
FK Senica managers
FC Nitra managers
Spartak Myjava managers
Association football midfielders
Footballers from Bratislava